Northeast Airlines can refer to a number of airlines, including:
 
 Northeast Airlines, a now defunct US airline which began operations in 1931 and merged with Delta Air Lines 1972
 Northeast Airlines (UK), a now defunct British airline which began operations in 1951 as BKS and was merged into British Airways in 1976
 Northeast Express Regional Airlines, a now defunct Maine-based regional airline which operated as an affiliate of Northwest Airlines
 Northeast Airlines (China), an airline based in Shenyang, People's Republic of China
 North East Airlines, a defunct airline based in Swaziland